Dennis Breakwell (born 2 July 1948 to John (Jack) Breakwell and Florence Emily Talbot), is a former English first-class cricketer who made over 400 appearances between 1969 and 1984 playing for Northamptonshire and Somerset County Cricket Clubs.  A left-handed batsman and slow left-arm orthodox bowler, Breakwell developed into an all-rounder as his career progressed, and he featured in a series of strong sides at Northampton alongside Colin Milburn and Sarfraz Nawaz and at Somerset alongside Joel Garner, Viv Richards and Ian Botham, rooming with the latter two in his early days at the club. Following the end of his playing career he became coach and head groundsman at King's College, Taunton coaching among others England batsman Jos Buttler and Somerset's Alex Barrow and Tom Webley.

Breakwell's only first-class century came against the New Zealanders at Taunton in July 1978.  His best bowling figures, 8 for 39, came when Northamptonshire beat Kent by an innings and 54 runs at Dover in 1970: his victims included Mike Denness, Colin Cowdrey, John Shepherd, Alan Knott and Derek Underwood.

Breakwell was hit for six consecutive sixes (not in the same over) by South African all-rounder Mike Procter in the Gloucestershire versus Somerset County Championship match at Taunton on the 27th of August, 1979.

References

External links
 

1948 births
Living people
English cricketers
Northamptonshire cricketers
Somerset cricketers
People from Brierley Hill
T. N. Pearce's XI cricketers